The 2016 Canadian Grand Prix (formally known as the Formula 1 Grand Prix du Canada 2016) was a Formula One motor race that took place on 12 June 2016 at the Circuit Gilles Villeneuve in Montreal, Quebec, Canada. The race was won by Lewis Hamilton.

This was Valtteri Bottas's last podium until the 2017 Australian Grand Prix.

Report

Background
Daniil Kvyat and Marcus Ericsson both took three-place grid penalties for causing avoidable accidents during the previous race in Monaco. After heavily damaging his car in an accident during the Monaco Grand Prix, Renault prepared a brand new Renault R.S.16 chassis for Jolyon Palmer for the race.

Tyre supplier Pirelli made the soft, supersoft and ultrasoft tyres available to teams for the race. Renault and Haas chose radical tyre allocation strategies, with both teams avoiding the supersoft compound entirely.

This also marked the 100th race start for Force India driver Sergio Pérez.

Race report 
At the start Sebastian Vettel made a fast start to lead into the first corner ahead of the two Mercedes who touched slightly forcing Nico Rosberg off the track and Lewis Hamilton continued in 2nd place. However the race changed when a virtual safety car was deployed to remove Jenson Button's McLaren which had had an engine failure. Vettel pitted and lost out to Hamilton, Ferrari team principal Maurizio Arrivabene admitted later that the decision was "wrong". Hamilton won the race ahead of Vettel with Valtteri Bottas in the Williams claiming the final podium spot, Championship leader Rosberg could only manage 5th after suffering from a slow puncture and being forced to make an extra stop.

Classification

Qualifying 

 Notes
  – Daniil Kvyat received a three-place grid penalty for causing an accident with Kevin Magnussen during the previous race in Monaco.
  – Marcus Ericsson received a three-place grid penalty for causing an accident with his teammate Felipe Nasr during the previous race in Monaco.
  – Kevin Magnussen failed to set a time within 107% of the fastest lap during Q1. As a result, his participation in the race came at the discretion of the stewards.
  – Kevin Magnussen received a five-place grid penalty for an unscheduled gearbox change.
  – Carlos Sainz Jr. received a five-place grid penalty for an unscheduled gearbox change.

Race

Championship standings after the race

Drivers' Championship standings

Constructors' Championship standings

 Note: Only the top five positions are included for both sets of standings.

References

External links

Canadian Grand Prix
Canadian
Grand Prix
Canadian Grand Prix
2010s in Montreal
2016 in Quebec